Shaqilath II (Nabataean Aramaic: , ŠQYLT; fl. 70), was a queen of the Nabataeans.

She was the daughter of Aretas IV of the Nabataeans. She ruled jointly with her husband Malichus II in 40–70. After his death she was regent for her son Rabel II in 70–76 AD. Copper and silver coins where she is depicted with her husband, and coins of her with her son, have been recovered.  Some of these coins are dated with regnal years to the left of the queen.

See also
 List of rulers of Nabatea
 Shaqilath

References

"Women in Power" last accessed January 10, 2007
 Dated Coins of Antiquity Cohen

1st-century Nabataean monarchs
1st-century women rulers